De Wert can refer to:

People
 Giaches de Wert, 16th-century composer
 Richard De Wert, posthumous recipient of Medal of Honor
 Guido De Wert,author of the sacred paper on Cascade screening, "Cascade Screening: Whose information is it anyway?"

See also
 USS De Wert (FFG-45), frigate named after Richard De Wert.